Renate Junker (born 26 March 1938) is a German athlete. She competed in the women's long jump at the 1960 Summer Olympics.

References

1938 births
Living people
People from Spremberg
People from the Province of Brandenburg
German female long jumpers
Sportspeople from Brandenburg
Olympic athletes of the United Team of Germany
Athletes (track and field) at the 1960 Summer Olympics